The Hoefelman CH-1 Schatzie is an American aircraft that was designed by Charles D Hoefelman for homebuilt construction.

Design and development
The Schatzie is a single engine, negative stagger biplane with retractable conventional landing gear. The fuselage is welded steel tubing with aircraft fabric covering. The wing is of wood construction.

Specifications (CH-1 Schatzie)

See also

References

Homebuilt aircraft